Athithi ( Guest) is a 2014 Indian Tamil-language thriller film written and directed by "Punch" Bharathan, who worked as a dialogue writer in films such as Ghilli, Dhill and Dhool and in his second directorial film after the Vijay-starrer Azhagiya Tamil Magan.

Produced by KP Ramakrishnan Nair, the film stars Nandha, Nikesh Ram, and Ananya, while Yuvina Parthavi, Varsha Ashwathi, Thambi Ramaiah, and Sendrayan play pivotal roles. The film is a remake of the 2010 Malayalam film Cocktail (2010), which was the actual remake of Butterfly on a Wheel. The film was released on 27 June 2014.

Athithi is an edge-of-the seat, realistic thriller about a life-changing - or ruining - day in the picture-perfect life of a successful and determined young man. In the world today, the list of necessities begins with a satisfying job and ends with wealth, and luxury is a happy family along with the package. When life is complete with all that, how bizarre can a normal day get, toppling the niceties altogether?

Plot
Madhiazhagan (Nandha) is a successful project manager at a leading property promoters firm. He is happily wedded to Vasuki (Ananya), and they have a five-year-old daughter named Pavi (Yuvina Parthavi). A posh house, a heftily paying job, a highly appreciative and supportive boss, and a happy family - Madhi's life is a far-fetched dream to most people in this era. However, all changes one day, when a man requests to be dropped en route, when Madhi and Vasu set out on a pleasant weekend. The mysterious stranger pulls out a pistol and begins to threaten the couple to bend to his wishes, holding Pavi as a hostage. The day sets off with the stranger making the couple draw out all the money that Madhi has to the last penny and then setting it all on fire. Next, he makes Madhi lose his career by leaking the top secrets of his company, trusted to him, to their competitor. The day goes on with further with more gimmicks by the stranger, while the couple are cornered to do it all for their daughter's life. For the same reason, they also refrain from making a complaint to the police, although they are tantalizingly near their target. While this seems endless, how they figure a way out of the mess, with a completely unexpected twist to the whole story in the end forms the rest of the story.

Cast

 Nandha as Madhiazhagan
 Nikesh Ram as Saravanan
 Ananya as Vasuki
 Yuvina Parthavi as Pavi
 Varsha Ashwathi as Lakshmi
 Thambi Ramaiah as Ondipuli
 Sendrayan as Poonai Kumar
 Soundararaja as Shiva
 Kaajal Pasupathi as Marikozhundhu
 Anjali Devi as Dr. Nirmala
 Sampath Ram as Sudalai
 Jayamani as Panchamirtham
 V.V. Prasanna
 Rachana Maurya as item number

Production

The film was announced in September 2013 when Spellbound Films Inc revealed they had signed on Ananya and contracted with Bharathan to make the film. Initially, actor Seenu who was, until now, seen in small roles, and Nikesh Ram, were touted to play the two heroes. However, before production began, Nandha replaced Seenu in one of the leading roles. The film began shoot in November 2013. This film is Bharathan's second directorial after Azhagiya Thamizh Magan (2007).

Soundtrack

Critical reception

The Hindu wrote, "It's a solid backbone for a thriller – except that Athithi, after a while, abandons this angle and drifts into a more personal zone. The bigger problem with Athithi is that the writing is all over the place." The Times of India gave it 2 stars out of 5 and said "This is a solid line for an edge-of-the-seat thriller but Bharathan resorts to formulaic filmmaking – unwarranted songs and a comedy track featuring Thambi Ramaiah that kills tension like bucketfuls of water dousing a minor fire; The whiplash editing tries to whip up some tension but it only feels desperate and overdone". Silverscreen.in summarized its review with "Athithi had a thrilling premise– a normal man playing a high-stakes game of hide-and-seek with a brooding stranger, but it is marred by poor execution and apathetic performances from the cast." Indiaglitz was more positive in its assessment, saying the movie was "worth investing your time in". Deccan Chronicle gave 2.5 stars and wrote, "The movie moves at its own pace with inconsistent narration, but it has its thrilling moments as well", calling it "Above Average".

References

External links
 

Tamil remakes of Malayalam films
2014 films
2010s Tamil-language films
Films scored by Bharadwaj (composer)
Indian remakes of British films
2010s mystery thriller films